Drypetes deplanchei subsp. affinis, commonly known as greybark or grey bark, is a flowering plant in the Putranjivaceae family. The subspecific epithet affinis ("similar to") alludes to its similarity to Drypetes sepiaria of India and Sri Lanka.

Description
It is a tree growing to 16 m in height, with smooth, pale grey bark often mottled pink with lichens. The leathery, oval leaves are usually 50–80 mm long and 30–40 mm wide. The small green flowers are 6 mm across, appearing from the end of December to late January. The oval, orange-red to yellow fruits are 20–25 mm long.

Distribution and habitat
The subspecies is endemic to Australia's subtropical Lord Howe Island in the Tasman Sea. There it is one of the most common and widespread trees in the lowlands.

References

deplanchei subsp. affinis
Malpighiales of Australia
Endemic flora of Lord Howe Island
Plants described in 1922
Plant subspecies
Taxa named by Ferdinand Albin Pax
Taxa named by Käthe Hoffmann